Benedicaria, which means "Way of Blessing," is a relatively new term for a number of loosely related family-based folk traditions found throughout Italy, most notably in Southern Italy and Sicily.  Though referred to by some as "Folk Magic" or even as "Witchcraft," the various Benedicaria Traditions are concerned almost exclusively with healing, cleansing, spirituality, and religious devotion.

Benedicaria is also known as Benedicazione (Blessing) in the Cattolichese dialect, Benedica (blessed) in Catanian, and Fa Lu Santuccio (lit. "do a little holy thing") in Campania.

Unlike practitioners of Stregheria and some practitioners of Stregoneria, practitioners of Benedicaria consider themselves to be devout Catholics, and the practices of Benedicaria are inextricably linked with Italian popular devotions found in Traditional Catholicism.

History 
It is difficult to figure what the origins of Benedicaria are, however, it could be speculated that it may have originated from  syncretism between Roman Catholicism and the incorporation of ancient pagan Italian folk traditions.

History of the term 

Amongst Italian communities, there is generally no word for "Benedicaria," and often it is simply called "the things we do and have always done." However, the word for a practitioner is Benedetto (for a male) or Benedetta (for a female), both of which mean "Blessed One." In Giuseppe Tornatore's 2000 motion picture Malèna, however, there is a scene where the older ladies of the village are exorcising Renato with Holy Cards and praying Rosaries.  The boy's father sees this and says "Va fanculo cu la benedicaria!"  ("Go fuck off with the Benedicaria!")

In the English language, the word Benedicaria itself first appeared in writing thanks to Sicilian-American author Vito Quattrocchi, who self-published his book Sicilian Benedicaria: Magical Catholicism.  Quattrocchi had already been a published author, with The Sicilian Blade (1993, Desert Publications) under his belt.  However, this move towards self-publication on Quattrocchi's part has proven to be successful, and now the word Benedicaria is in common use , at least throughout the internet, as a way of identifying these traditions of spiritual practices.

Along with Quattrocchi, another name associated with Benedicaria is that of Agostino Taumaturgo, a Roman Catholic priest who maintains Quattrocchi's website and whose book, The Things We Do: Ways of the Holy Benedetta was published in 2007.

Discussions on the subject of Benedicaria could be found on the forums at the Stregoneria Italiana website (now inactive), whose membership consists of both Catholics and Pagans who work together to debunk the stereotypes prevalent regarding Italian culture and spirituality. The discussion on this site also covers the subjects of Italian Folk Culture (i.e. Stregoneria, Fattura, etc.), Christian Magic, and many other aspects of Italian language, food, history, politics, and culture.

Practices of Benedicaria 

Benedicaria is catch-all term for a number of family-based spiritual traditions with a great deal of flexibility, and as a result, the practices found in Benedicaria may vary from family to family and from individual to individual.  Amongst the more commonly known practices are the use of olive oil and/or eggs as a cure for the Malocchio or Evil Eye, the use of candles, the Rosary, herbs, and Novenas in honor of the various Saints.  According to the information given at the Italian Benedicaria website, most of the prayers used in Benedicaria are taken directly from Catholic prayerbooks.

The same sacramentals used in the Catholic Church are used in Benedicaria, whereby the sacramentals are never disrespected. However they are also used, to a small degree in stregoneria, where there is more of a grey area and therefore a practitioner may find themselves walking the fine line between the sacred and the profane or, stepping right into sacrilege.

One example of the sacramentals being used in Benedicaria is in the so-called "Exorcism of Saint Anthony", wherein the practitioner holds a crucifix over the object which he or she wishes to exorcise, and says: "Behold the Cross of the Lord!  Begone, ye hostile powers!  The Lion of the tribe of Judah hath triumphed, he who is the rod of David!"  This rite is found, in its entirety, within the pre-Vatican II Roman Catholic Rite of Solemn Exorcism, known as Ritus Exorcizandi Obssessos a Daemonio.

In fact, nearly all of the Sacramentals used by Benedetti come from the Church in times before the Second Vatican Council, and a number of practitioners care little or nothing for the changes that took place after that Council (which many Benedicaria-practitioners and even ordinary Catholics feel may have been a somewhat forced imposition of Northern European or Protestant ideologies on the rest of the world).

Another common practice is the use of eggs as a form of cleansing or to remove the Evil Eye.  In this exercise, the egg is washed, dried, and then covered in Holy Water while the practitioner prays over it, saying an Apostles' Creed, an Our Father, and three Hail Marys.  The egg is then rolled over the alleged victim's body in a loosely prescribed pattern, paying especial attention to any area which may feel the most pain; the egg is believed to absorb any negative energy.  After doing this with the egg for fifteen minutes, the egg is broken by throwing it in the toilet and flushing the remains.

This is very similar to a practice found in Mexican Curanderismo and Filipino Pagtatawas which has the same objective, and it is also an example of a Catholic Sacramental being combined with a possible pre-Christian practice, with the latter being subordinated to the belief-system of Catholicism.

Relationship with Stregheria and Stregoneria 

There is much discussion on the subject of what exactly is entailed by the terms Benedicaria, Stregoneria, and Stregheria.  However, the one thing upon which all parties agree is that these three things are all different from one another.  In 2005, a poster on Mystic Wicks asked Raven Grimassi his opinion concerning Benedicaria, and Grimassi responded that he had read Quattrocchi's book, that it seemed authentic in the material it covered, and that it neither has nor claims any relationship with Italian Witchcraft.  In response to this, Quattrocchi expressed his thanks that all sides of the debate acknowledge Stregheria and Benedicaria as two entirely separate and unrelated practices.

The relationship between Stregoneria and Benedicaria is more confounded entirely since in their purest forms the two are completely distinct. However, most practitioners make use of elements from both traditions, and many practitioners were raised with or taught elements of both traditions, so much so that over the course of centuries, it has become impossible to tell where one ends and the other begins.  In many cases, even the practitioner herself is not certain as to the distinctions.

This confusion between the two practices became an object of contention between Rue Roselli and Vito Quattrocchi in May 2007, when Quattrocchi posted two videos on YouTube featuring an interview between himself and a sympathetic priest regarding the subject.  In these videos, the priest (a mutual friend of both Roselli and Quattrocchi) stressed the fact that Benedicaria is not witchcraft, that it is entirely separate from witchcraft, and that the practitioner of Benedicaria is generally a devout Catholic who makes no pretensions of being a witch.  Roselli cited the tendency of Benedetti to blend the two practices, which was not mentioned in the videos.  The videos have since been removed from YouTube, but this debate comes to show that the relationship between Benedicaria and Stregoneria is one of synthesis and convolution.

See also
Folk Christianity
Folk Medicine
Malocchio
Cunning folk

References

External links
 Rue's Kitchen - Information on Stregoneria, Benedicaria, and other Italian practices.
 Italian Folk Tales

Italian traditions

Supernatural healing
Witchcraft in Italy